Bullmann is a German surname. Notable people with the surname include:

Maik Bullmann (born 1967), German Greco-Roman wrestler
Udo Bullmann (born 1956), German politician

See also
 Bullman

German-language surnames